Katharina Konradi (born 13 June 1988) is a Kyrgyzstani operatic soprano based in Germany, at the Hamburg State Opera from 2018. She has performed at major opera houses, especially as Mozart's Susanna and Zdenka in Arabella, and at the Bayreuth Festival. She is also known as a lieder singer with a broad repertoire including contemporary music, performed at Wigmore Hall in London among others.

Career 
Born in Bishkek, Konradi grew up in Kyrgyzstan, speaking Russian. She moved to Hamburg at age 15, not speaking any German and obtained her Abitur at the Johannes-Brahms-Schule in Pinneberg in 2009. She studied for her Master of Arts from 2014 to 2016 at the Hochschule für Musik und Theater München, voice with Christiane Iven and Lied with Donald Sulzen. She took masterclasses with Helmut Deutsch and Klesie Kelly-Moog.

Konradi was a member of the Hessisches Staatstheater Wiesbaden from 2015 to 2018, where she appeared in leading roles of the lyric soprano repertoire, including Pamina in Mozart's Die Zauberflöte, Gretel in Humperdinck's Hänsel und Gretel, Adele in Die Fledermaus by Johann Strauss, Susanna in Mozart's Le nozze di Figaro, Zerlina in Don Giovanni, and Nannetta in Verdi's Falstaff. After her performance as Ännchen in Weber's Der Freischütz at the Hamburg State Opera in 2017, she was engaged at the house from 2018. The same year, she first performed at the Semperoper in Dresden, as Zdenka in Arabella by Richard Strauss. The BBC has supported her from 2018 with the New Generation Artists scheme.

Konradi made her debut at the Bayreuth Festival in 2019 as Young Shepherd in Tannhäuser, directed by Tobias Kratzer, and a Flower Girl in Parsifal. In March 2019, she was presented in Rolando Villazón's television series for Arte, Stars von morgen (Stars of tomorrow). She first appeared at the Bavarian State Opera in 2021 as Sophie in Der Rosenkavalier by R. Strauss, directed by Barrie Kosky.

Konradi is focussed on lied repertoire from the classical period to contemporary, often collaborating with pianist Eric Schneider. She first performed at Wigmore Hall in London with pianist Joseph Middleton in 2020. Her solo CDs are dedicated to the art of lied. Her debut CD, after winning the Deutscher Musikwettbewerb, was a collection of songs by eight composers, accompanied by Gerold Huber. Titled Gedankenverloren (Lost in thought), it includes songs by Lili Boulanger, and three settings by Lori Laitman of children's poems written in Terezin ghetto.

In concert, she appeared in the opening concert of the 2017/18 season at the Elbphilharmonie, performing Beethoven's Lieder des Clärchens from his incidental music Egmont, with the NDR Elbphilharmonie Orchester conducted by Thomas Hengelbrock. In 2019, she performed the soprano solo in Mahler's Resurrection Symphony with the Bavarian Radio Symphony Orchestra and Chorus, conducted by Daniel Harding.

Private life 
Konradi lives with her husband, pianist Roland Vieweg, in Dötlingen near Wildeshausen.

Awards 
 2016: Deutscher Musikwettbewerb

Recordings 
 Gedankenverloren. Lieder by Schubert, Manfred Trojahn, Claude Debussy, Lili Boulanger, Sergei Rachmaninoff, Ernst Krenek, Lori Laitman and Richard Strauss, with pianist Gerold Huber (Genuin; 2018) 
 Liebende. Lieder by Strauss, Mozart and Schubert with pianist Daniel Heide (CAvi; 2021)

References

Further reading

External links 
 
 Katharina Konradi operabase.com
 Katharina Konradi / Soprano Künstlersekretariat at Gasteig
 Katharina Konradi (Soprano) Bach Cantatas Website 2021
 Robert Hugill: To stay true to yourself: I chat to soprano Katharina Konradi as she releases a new disc of lieder and makes her debut as Sophie in Strauss' Der Rosenkavalier in Munich planethugill.com 20 March 2021

21st-century women opera singers
Operatic sopranos
University of Music and Performing Arts Munich alumni
Kyrgyzstani opera singers
1988 births
Living people